Eudemus (Eudēmos) may refer to:
 , d. 353 BC, a political exile from Cyprus and friend of Aristotle, after whom Aristotle's dialogue Eudemus, or On the Soul was named: see Corpus Aristotelicum#Fragments
 Eudemus of Rhodes, c. 370-300 BC, philosopher and student of Aristotle
 Eudemus (general), d. 316 BC, general of Alexander the Great
 Eudemus (physician), any of several Greek physicians, 4th century BC–2nd century AD
 Eudemus of Pergamum, 3rd century BC, teacher of Philonides of Laodicea and dedicatee of Book 2 of Apollonius of Perga's Conics
 Eudemus of Pergamum, 2nd century BC, implicated in the enmity between Tiberius Gracchus and Q. Pompeius
 Eudemus of Argos, 2nd century AD, author of On Rhetorical Language (Περὶ λέξεων ῥητορικῶν), perhaps an important source of the  Suda
 Avdimi of Haifa, an Amora of the late 3rd/early 4th century AD
 Eudemus, Bishop of Patara (Lycia), 4th century AD
 Eudemos, the name of two Catholicoi of the Catholicate of Abkhazia (16th and 17th centuries)
 Eudemos I, of the Diasamidze family, Catholicos of Kartli in the 1630s

See also
 Eudemis